Vanderford Valley (Other English names: Vanderford Strath, Vanderford Submarine Valley Hungarian Vanderford-selfvölgy) is an undersea valley, named in association with the Vanderford Glacier, which reaches a depth of 2287 m (7,503 ft). This may be the deepest glacier-carved valley in the world.

External links
Glacial geomorphology

Valleys of Antarctica
Landforms of Wilkes Land